Fades Em All is the first single released from Jamal's debut album, Last Chance, No Breaks. The original version of the song was produced by Redman and Rockwilder, while the popular remix was produced by Pete Rock. The single found decent success, having peaked at #9 on the Hot Rap Singles, #59 on the Hot R&B/Hip-Hop Singles & Tracks and #40 on the Hot Dance Music/Maxi-Singles Sales.

Track listing

A-Side
"Fades Em All" (Pete Rock Remix)- 5:16
"Fades Em All"- 5:03

B-Side
"Fades Em All" (Pete Rock Instrumental)- 5:15
"Fades Em All" (Acapella)- 4:57

1995 singles
Jamal (rapper) songs
1995 songs
Songs written by Jamal (rapper)